The Goyim Defense League (GDL) is an antisemitic hate group and conspiracy theory network of individuals who are active on social media websites and operate an online video platform called GoyimTV. The GDL also performs banner drops, papering neighborhoods with flyers, and other stunts to harass Jews. The GDL emerged in 2018 and is led by the antisemitic provocateur Jon Minadeo II. GDL is currently tracked by the Southern Poverty Law Center as a hate group.

Name

"Goyim" is a sometimes disparaging Yiddish and Hebrew word for non-Jews. The name "Goyim Defense League" is a play on two Jewish organizations — the violent extremist Jewish Defense League, and the anti-hate organization Anti-Defamation League (ADL). Similarly, GDL's logo is a parody of ADL's.

Description 
BuzzFeed News described the GDL as white supremacist.  The Goyim Defense League was listed by Middle East Media Research Institute in a March 2019 Special Report of groups engaged in "Online Incitement against Jews."

GoyimTV 

GDL operates an online video channel called GoyimTV. Minadeo had launched the platform with the help of Dominic Di Giorgio of Port St. Lucie, Florida. It is used to share videos, live stream, and attract supporters to GDL. 

In 2020, GoyimTV was removed by its online provider after a flood of complaints. In late October 2022, the site was again taken down after a hold was placed on it by its domain provider. Minadeo claimed that this was due to pressure from Jews. As of late January 2023, the site was back online.

Activities 
The GDL is most active in California, Colorado, Florida and New York. GDL activities have also taken place in Texas (see below).

Patrick Little's Twitter HQ stunt 
In December 2017, after getting suspended from Twitter, Patrick Little stood outside of Twitter headquarters in San Francisco, holding a sign that read "It's not okay to be white @Twitter".

Little's "Name the Jew" Tour 

Patrick Little, a member of the GDL, ran on a Republican Party ticket in the 2018 United States Senate election in California for Dianne Feinstein's seat. A native of Albany, California, Little is an IT engineer who had previously served in the United States Marine Corps in Afghanistan. Little's campaign gained attention in May 2018 when he polled second only to Feinstein in a SurveyUSA poll with 18% of the general electorate and 46% with Republicans. However, the California Republican Party denounced Little and he was removed from their convention in San Diego, while stomping on an Israeli flag, claiming "They just had me expelled from the building because I won't serve Israel", calling the Californian Republican Party "Zionist stooges."

Just after the election, Little toured the United States in July and August 2018, with placards bearing antisemitic phrases such as "Jews Rape Kids", "Jews Killed 30 Million", "The Holocaust is a Lie" and pronouncing openly in public a number of antisemitic conspiracy theories, such as claiming that the Holocaust is a hoax, that Israel played a major role in 9/11, that Jews controlled the African slave trade before the Civil War, and that "Jews kill Christians — they do it a lot historically." 

On one occasion in 2018, Little launched a blimp in San Francisco Bay with a text "Jews Rape Kids" and attempted to fly it near San Francisco's Oracle Park stadium during the Jewish Heritage Night with the San Francisco Giants event but failed due poor weather conditions. These so-called "J-Walks" were recorded and the videos were put on the internet on platforms such as YouTube and BitChute by Little and the GDL. Little's "Name the Jew" Tour ran from Portland, Oregon to Portland, Maine, stopping off at: Olympia, Washington; Seattle; Missoula, Montana; Helena; Alberton; Fargo, North Dakota; Minneapolis; Skokie, Illinois; Providence, Rhode Island; Princeton, New Jersey; Boston and New York City.

Eventually, Little received 62,830 votes, with 1.4% of the total vote share. Little claimed that he was the victim of voter fraud by "the Jewish supremacists and the Zionists" and stated that he would run in the 2020 United States presidential election. He moved to Idaho and ran for one of two vacant seats in the 2019 Garden City, Idaho City Council election, coming in last with 126 votes, 3.7%.

Trolling Cameo celebrities 
In November 2018, a number of celebrities who feature on the Cameo app, who provide personalized "shoutouts" to people who pay a certain amount of money, up to $500, were successfully trolled by the GDL and gained the group significant international media attention by getting celebrities to give coded antisemitic shoutouts. Among those implicated were NFL quarterback Brett Favre, rapper Soulja Boy and comedian Andy Dick.

For example, Favre said "shoutout to the Handsome Truth and the GDL boys," and "Keep fighting, too, and don't ever forget the USS Liberty and the men and women who died on that day," referencing an American ship which was attacked by the Israelis in 1967 during the Six-Day War. While, Soulja Boy asked viewers to check out the GDL anthem "Name the Juice" (i.e. – Name the Jew) on SoundCloud, saying "GDL for life, bitch." The rap song which Soulja Boy references features Holocaust denial lyrics such as "I heard your quotes from your Talmud book, you're a fake Jew bitch and you never got cooked, never got gassed" and "they wanna tax and take whats ours, lie about ovens, lampshades and showers, wanna play the victim, but you're really a coward, thats why I name the Jew every second of hours."

Conspiracy theory flyers distribution 
 
Antisemitic flyers were distributed in residential areas of Austin, Texas and Beverly Hills, California during November 2021. Flyers were also distributed in San Antonio, Texas during January 2022; Berkeley, San Francisco, Palo Alto, and Marin County, California during February; Atlanta, Cartersville, and Savannah, Georgia in April; Los Angeles in June; and Ann Arbor overnight before Rosh Hashanah on September 25-26, 2022. During one weekend in January 2022, flyers appeared in California, Colorado, Florida, Maryland, Texas, and Wisconsin. The Anti-Defamation League (ADL) said the GDL has continued propaganda drives across 17 states in 2022.

The pages featured lists of officials with Jewish-sounding names (many of whom are not Jews), insinuating that such people at Centers for Disease Control and Prevention were responsible for the spread of the COVID-19 pandemic, were responsible for the Russo-Ukrainian War, "Every single aspect of the Media is Jewish", and "Every single aspect of Disney child grooming is Jewish". The flyers were hurled onto parked cars and private driveways, neatly folded in baggies weighed down by pebbles, rice, corn kernels, and/or beans.

The ADL stated that a December 2021 incident where anti-Semitic banners were displayed over a Brevard County, Florida highway overpass was the work of the GDL. It said that Minadeo had offered $100 in "GoyimTV money" to anyone who could get the network in the news. In October 2022, GDL members including Minadeo hung a banner over a Los Angeles highway saying "Kanye is right about the Jews", in reference to antisemitic comments recently made by the rapper.

Minadeo and GDL moved to Florida in December 2022. On January 21, 2023 Nicholas A Bysheim was arrested in Atlantis, Florida for obstructing law enforcement after being ticketed for littering antisemitic hate speech flyers onto residents' lawns. GDL littering incidents also occurred in West Palm Beach and Boca Raton. On January 28, 2023, Jon E. Minadeo II, David Y. Kim, Jonathan K. Baldwin and Nicholas A. Bysheim were cited for littering Palm Beach private residences with their flyers.

In February 2022, flyers were distributed in neighborhoods of Daytona Beach, Florida and at the Daytona 500. Mike Chitwood, the sheriff of Volusia County, Florida, was the target of harassment by the organization due to his stance on hate speech. On March 6, 2023, in Monmouth Junction, New Jersey, a 38-year-old male was arrested after allegedly threatened to kill Chitwood on 4chan.

References

Further reading 
 Goyim Defense League report at the Anti-Defamation League

2018 in Internet culture
American conspiracy theorists
Antisemitism in California
Conspiracist media
Neo-Nazi organizations in the United States
Internet trolling
Sonoma County, California